Varzaq may refer to:
 Varzaq, South Khorasan
 Varzaq Rural District, in Isfahan Province
 Varzaq-e Jonubi Rural District, in Isfahan Province